Caspase activity and apoptosis inhibitor 1 is a protein that in humans is encoded by the CAAP1 gene.

See also
 Caspase
 Apoptosis

References

External links

Further reading